World Wheelchair Rugby (WWR) is the international governing body for the sport of wheelchair rugby. 

WWR is a volunteer-run organisation that supervises the international competitions and development of wheelchair rugby. 

It was created in 1993 as a sport section of the International Stoke Mandeville Wheelchair Sports Federation (ISMWSF). (The ISMWSF is known as the International Wheelchair and Amputee Sports Federation (IWAS) since 2005). WWR became an independent sport federation on 1 January 2010.

See also
Wheelchair Rugby World Championships
IWRF Americas Championship
IWRF European Championship
IWRF Asia-Oceania Championship
International Wheelchair and Amputee Sports Federation (IWAS)

References

External links
Official site

Wheelchair rugby
Paralympic Games